The American High-Speed Rail Act is a proposed bill in the United States Congress. The bill would invest $205 billion into high-speed rail over five years.

The bill was reintroduced by congressman Seth Moulton.

References

High-speed rail in the United States